Paradelphacodes is a genus of true bugs belonging to the family Delphacidae.

The species of this genus are found in Europe and Northern America.

Species:
 Paradelphacodes gvosdevi (Mitjaev, 1980) 
 Paradelphacodes litoralis (Reuter, 1880)

References

Delphacidae